The 1975 BRDC International Trophy, formally known as the 27th Daily Express International Trophy, was a non-championship Formula One race held at Silverstone Circuit on 13 April 1975. It was organised by the circuit owners, the British Racing Drivers' Club, as a "curtain raiser" for the European portion of the 1975 Formula One season. James Hunt, driving for the small Hesketh Racing team, set the fastest lap time in practice and took pole position for the start. In the race he continued to run at the front, heading the leading pack for many laps and setting fastest lap of the race on lap 14. Third-place runner, McLaren driver Emerson Fittipaldi, equalled his time on lap 23. However, Hunt's engine failed at the start of lap 26 and the lead was inherited by second-place runner Niki Lauda in his Ferrari. Lauda held the lead for the remainder of the race, despite Fittipaldi "pull[ing] out the stops" to try and pass him. At the finishing flag, Fittipaldi was only one-tenth of a second behind Lauda, with Mario Andretti in a Parnelli taking the last podium position in third.

Classification

References
Citations

Other sources
Race results at ChicaneF1.com

BRDC International Trophy
BRDC International Trophy
BRDC